Off Base is an American baseball commentary show on MLB Network. The show airs every weekday at 3:00 p.m. ET  during the Major League Baseball regular season and is hosted by Lauren Gardner with analysis from Xavier Scruggs, Hannah Keyser, Keith McPherson, and various guest analysts. Off Base is a youth-oriented show, featuring a segment highlighting the off-field fashion choices of MLB players and another segment dedicated to discussions about growing baseball's influence with younger audiences.

History
Off Base was announced as an addition to MLB Network's programming in April 2022, just after the 2021–22 Major League Baseball lockout and prior to the start of the 2022 season. The show's direction was noted as being a part of MLB's efforts to address low viewership with younger audiences, particularly among Generation Z and Millennials. A poll conducted by Seton Hall University three months prior to the debut of the show found that MLB viewership was declining, particularly among younger fans.

Lauren Gardner, who has been an MLB Network personality since 2019, was tapped as the show's inaugural host. Former MLB first baseman Xavier Scruggs, baseball writer Hannah Keyser, and WFAN Radio sports radio host Keith McPherson joined the show as permanent analysts, with a fourth spot on the set left open for rotating guest analysts, which have included former MLB catcher Anthony Recker and actress Ellen Adair. The show debuted on April 11, 2022, from a new set at MLB Network's Studio 21 in Secaucus, New Jersey.

References

MLB Network original programming
2022 American television series debuts
2020s American television series
Major League Baseball studio shows